The Elusive Twelve (Italian: L'inafferrabile 12) is a 1950 Italian comedy film directed by Mario Mattoli and starring Walter Chiari, Silvana Pampanini and Isa Barzizza. It was shot at the Farnesina Studios of Titanus in Rome. The film's sets were designed by the art director Piero Filippone. It earned 400 million lira at the domestic box office.

Plot
When his wife gives birth to twin boys, her husband sends one to the orphanage as they already have eleven children and thirteen would be unlucky. The two boys grow up completely apart, one becoming a professional footballer for Juventus and the other an employee of the state lottery. Without meeting, the two now keep accidentally crossing paths. The second man is mistaken for the first man by his girlfriend, and ends up playing in a football match in place of his twin.

Cast
 Walter Chiari as Carletto Esposito\Brandoletti
 Silvana Pampanini as Clara
 Isa Barzizza as Teresa
 Carlo Campanini as Beppe
 Aroldo Tieri as Il dottor Giechi
 Marilyn Buferd as L'assistente del dott. Giechi
 Laura Gore as Carletta
 Enzo Biliotti as Cav. Federico Pallino
 Agnese Dubbini as La levatrice
 Luigi Pavese as Umberto
 Pina Gallini as La direttrice
 Yvonne Sanson as Herself

References

Bibliography
 Chiti, Roberto & Poppi, Roberto. Dizionario del cinema italiano: Dal 1945 al 1959. Gremese Editore, 1991.
 Gundle, Stephen. Fame Amid the Ruins: Italian Film Stardom in the Age of Neorealism. Berghahn Books, 2019.

External links

1950 films
1950 comedy films
1950s sports films
Italian sports films
Italian association football films
1950s Italian-language films
Italian black-and-white films
Films directed by Mario Mattoli
Italian comedy films
Titanus films
Films set in Rome
1950s Italian films